The Union Pacific West Line (UP-W) is a Metra commuter rail line operated by Union Pacific Railroad in Chicago, Illinois and its western suburbs. Metra does not refer to its lines by particular colors, but the timetable accents for the Union Pacific West line are "Kate Shelley Rose" pink, honoring an Iowa woman who saved a Chicago & North Western Railway train from disaster in 1881. Green and yellow were already selected for the Union Pacific North Line and Union Pacific Northwest Line, respectively, so pink was chosen for this line. Therefore, the UP-W is the only Metra line that uses a color to honor a person instead of a fallen flag railroad. Until the late 1940s the line had a branch to Freeport, Illinois. It diverged from the main line at West Chicago and had stations at Elgin, Marengo, Belvidere, Rockford, Freeport, and other communities. The line was once known as the Chicago & Northwestern/West Line until UP took over the C&NW in 1995. The line runs as part of the Union Pacific Railroad's Geneva Subdivision (ex-C&NW line to Clinton, Iowa.)

The line runs from the Ogilvie Transportation Center in downtown Chicago through the western suburbs to Elburn. This is the oldest railway route built from Chicago, the route of the Galena and Chicago Union Railroad along Kinzie Street.

As of December 5, 2022, Metra operates 58 trains (29 in each direction) on the Union Pacific West Line on weekdays.

On weekends, all trains run the full route to Elburn, with Metra operating 10 roundtrip trains on Saturday and nine on Sundays and holidays.

Union Pacific is building a third railroad line from West Chicago through all of Geneva. The project started in September 2022 and is expected to be finished in July 2024. The improvements are designed to ensure smoother traffic flow and reduce conflicts between commuter and freight trains.

Ridership
Since 2014 annual ridership has declined from 8,423,188 to 7,883,185, an overall decline of 6.4%. Due to the COVID-19 pandemic, ridership dropped to 1,945,886 passengers in 2020 and to 1,486,536 passengers in 2021.

Station stops

References

External links 

 Metra Union Pacific/West service schedule

Metra lines
Chicago and North Western Railway